Efrem Zimbalist Jr. (November 30, 1918 – May 2, 2014) was an American actor best known for his starring roles in the television series 77 Sunset Strip and The F.B.I. He is also known as recurring character "Dandy Jim Buckley" in the series Maverick and as the voice behind the character Alfred Pennyworth in the DC Animated Universe.

Early years
Zimbalist was born in 1918 in Brooklyn to Jewish immigrants Efrem Zimbalist Sr. (1889–1985), a famous Russian-born violinist  and symphony conductor, and Alma Gluck (1884–1938), an equally famous Romanian-born operatic soprano. He had an older sister, Mary (1915–2008), along with a half-sister from his mother's first marriage, author Marcia Davenport (1903–1996). His stepmother was Mary Louise Curtis Bok Zimbalist, the founder of the Curtis Institute of Music. Both parents converted to Anglican Christianity and regularly attended the Episcopal Church. Efrem Jr. attended Fay School in Southborough, Massachusetts.

Zimbalist boarded at St. Paul's School in Concord, New Hampshire, taking part in school plays. He briefly attended Yale University but was expelled, reinstated and expelled a second time on account of low grades. He moved back to New York City in 1936 to work as a page for NBC radio where he had small on-air roles as well as presenting shows. He furthered his acting training at Neighborhood Playhouse before serving in the United States Army during World War II, where he became friends with writer and director Garson Kanin.

Military service
Zimbalist was drafted in 1941.  Inducted into the United States Army, he completed his initial training at Fort Dix, New Jersey.  Selected for officer candidate school, after graduation in 1943 he received his commission as a second lieutenant of Infantry.  Zimbalist was assigned as a platoon leader in Company L, 60th Infantry Regiment, 9th Infantry Division and participated in combat in Europe following the Normandy landings.   He was discharged at the end of the war, and his awards and decorations included the Bronze Star Medal and Combat Infantryman Badge, in addition to the Purple Heart he received for a shrapnel wound to his leg during the battle of Hürtgen Forest.

Career

Early career
Following the war, Zimbalist returned to New York and made his Broadway acting debut in The Rugged Path, starring Spencer Tracy. This led to a stage career as both actor and producer. His producing successes included bringing three Gian Carlo Menotti operas to Broadway, one of which, The Consul, won the Pulitzer Prize for Music in 1950.

In 1954–1955, he co-starred in his first television series, Concerning Miss Marlowe.

Warner Bros. star

In 1956, Zimbalist was put under contract by Warner Bros. and moved to Hollywood.
Zimbalist's first recurring role in a Warner Bros. Television series was as roguish gambler "Dandy Jim Buckley" on Maverick, opposite James Garner in 1957, and making five appearances as the character. In 1958, Zimbalist played the co-lead Stuart "Stu" Bailey in 77 Sunset Strip, a popular detective series running until 1964.

During this period, he made several concurrent appearances in other Warner Bros. television shows, such as Hawaiian Eye, The Alaskans, and Bronco. He also starred as the lead in several feature films for Warners, such as Bombers B-52, The Deep Six, A Fever in the Blood and The Chapman Report. Zimbalist was in such demand during this time that he was given a vacation by Jack L. Warner, owing to exhaustion from his busy schedule.

Jack Warner lent him to Columbia Pictures for By Love Possessed in exchange for adding several years to his Warners' contract, but he refused to let Zimbalist appear in  BUtterfield 8 for Metro-Goldwyn-Mayer.

In 1959, he was awarded the Golden Globe for "Most Promising Newcomer – Male".

The F.B.I. television series 

Apart from 77 Sunset Strip, Zimbalist was most widely known for his starring role as Inspector Lewis Erskine in the Quinn Martin television production The F.B.I., which premiered on September 19, 1965, and aired its final episode on September 8, 1974. Zimbalist was generous in his praise of producer Martin and of his own experience starring in the show. Those who worked with him were equally admiring of the star's professionalism and likable personality.

Zimbalist maintained a strong personal relationship with F.B.I. director J. Edgar Hoover, who requested that the show be technically accurate and portray his agents in the best possible light, and he insisted actors playing F.B.I. employees undergo a background check. Zimbalist subsequently spent a week in contact with Hoover in Washington, D.C. and at the F.B.I. Academy in Quantico, Virginia. The men remained mutual admirers for the rest of Hoover's life. Hoover held up Zimbalist as a model for F.B.I. employees' personal appearance.

The Society of Former Special Agents of the Federal Bureau of Investigation honored the character of Lewis Erskine in 1985 with a set of retired credentials, and on June 8, 2009 FBI Director Robert Mueller presented Zimbalist with a plaque honoring him for his work on the series.

The show was revived in the 1980s as Today's FBI  starring Mike Connors.

Other television work

After 77 Sunset Strip, he appeared in other series, including CBS's short-lived The Reporter starring Harry Guardino as journalist Danny Taylor of the fictitious New York Globe. He also appeared in leading and supporting roles in several feature films, including Harlow, A Fever in the Blood (a film about a ruthless politician), Wait Until Dark and Airport 1975.

Zimbalist had a recurring role as Daniel Chalmers, a white-collar con man, on his daughter Stephanie Zimbalist's 1980s television detective series Remington Steele. He also recurred in the television dramatic series Hotel.

In 1990, he played the father of Zorro in the Christian Broadcasting Network's The New Zorro. Zimbalist relinquished the role after the program's first season because of the filming at studios outside Madrid, Spain, and the role subsequently went to Henry Darrow. He had a small recurring role in the 1990s hit science fiction television series Babylon 5 as William Edgars.

Also in the 1990s, Zimbalist played Alfred Pennyworth in Batman: The Animated Series as well as in Superman: The Animated Series, The New Batman Adventures, Justice League, Static Shock, and the animated films Batman: Mask of the Phantasm, Batman & Mr. Freeze: SubZero, Batman: Mystery of the Batwoman; he also played villain Doctor Octopus in Spider-Man: The Animated Series. He appeared on the Trinity Broadcasting Network and as himself in the 1998 Smithsonian Institution production of Gemstones of America. He performed as the narrator in "Good Morning, America" by Elinor Remick Warren—Cambria CD #1042 (1993).

Zimbalist wrote an autobiography, My Dinner of Herbs, published by Limelight Editions, New York.

In 2008, he appeared in the short film The Delivery, in which he played a professor who helps a young girl in her struggles for literacy. The film won first place in fantasy at the Dragon*Con Film Festival and was an official selection at the Los Angeles International Children's Festival and the Reel Women International Film Festival in 2009.

Personal life

In December 1941, Zimbalist married his first wife, Emily Munroe McNair. They had two children, Efrem "Skip" Zimbalist III (b. 1947) and Nancy (1944–2012). In January 1950, Emily died from cancer.

In 1956, Zimbalist married Loranda Stephanie Spalding. Loranda's middle name was given to their daughter, actress Stephanie Zimbalist. On February 5, 2007, aged 73, Loranda died from lung cancer.

Religion
Zimbalist's parents, Alma Gluck and Efrem Zimbalist, were of Jewish descent but, on emigrating to America, had left the religion. Moreover, Efrem Zimbalist stated, "As far as I am concerned, there has been no Jew in the family for sixty-five years."

Zimbalist was baptized in the Episcopal Church. He said that when growing up he was taken to church every Sunday. He attended St. Paul's School, an Episcopal boarding school in New Hampshire. Zimbalist said his faith gave him comfort when Emily died.

He had a nine-year association with the practice of Transcendental Meditation as taught by Maharishi Mahesh Yogi. Zimbalist described the Maharishi Yogi as a "fascinating character", but found the meditation method "... was a total waste of energy for me."

In the late 1970s, he was drawn to the Charismatic Christianity movement. His first association was with Jim Bakker and Tammy Faye Bakker's PTL ministry. For several years, he was a member of the PTL board. PTL's principal televangelistic successor, the Trinity Broadcasting Network (TBN), engaged Zimbalist to make its many announcements including the station's idents every half hour, which aired between 1992 and 2012. In a five-minute segment called "The Word" aired on TBN at 25 minutes after the hour, Zimbalist would read a verse from the Bible, eventually completing the entire text, verse by verse. In 1989, he said, "for a while I did go overboard in my association with a fundamentalist group".

In later life, Zimbalist joined the congregation of an Episcopal parish near to his home. Afterward he joined the Anglican Church of Our Savior in Santa Barbara; he was an occasional reader there and requested donations be made to them (among others) in his obituary.

Politics
In 1963 and 1964, Zimbalist joined fellow actors William Lundigan, Chill Wills and Walter Brennan in making appearances on behalf of U.S. Senator Barry Goldwater, the Republican candidate, in his election campaign against U.S. President Lyndon B. Johnson.

Death
Zimbalist died at the age of 95, the same age his father had died, on May 2, 2014, from natural causes.

Filmography

Film

Television

Video games

Video

Theatre

References

Notes

Citations

Sources

External links 

 
 
 
 2011 interview

1918 births
2014 deaths
20th-century American male actors
21st-century American male actors
Male actors from Los Angeles
Male actors from New York City
Military personnel from New York City
American male film actors
American male voice actors
California Republicans
Curtis family
St. Paul's School (New Hampshire) alumni
Yale University alumni
Warner Bros. contract players
Efren Jr.
Fay School alumni
New Star of the Year (Actor) Golden Globe winners
New Right (United States)
20th-century American Episcopalians
United States Army personnel of World War II
United States Army officers